David E. Finck (born August 26, 1958) is an American jazz bassist. He plays both bass guitar and double bass.

Finck was born in Rochester, New York. He studied under Sam Goradetzer and Michael Shahan of the Philadelphia Orchestra, and graduated from Eastman School of Music in 1980. He played with Woody Herman in 1980–81 and then moved to New York City, where he played with Joe Williams, Annie Ross, Mel Lewis, Al Cohn, Ernestine Anderson, Rosemary Clooney, Tom Harrell, Jerry Dodgion, Phil Woods, Clark Terry, and Al Grey in the 1980s. He worked with Paquito D'Rivera and Steve Kuhn in the 1990s, as well as Freddie Hubbard, Makoto Ozone, and Eddie Daniels. Finck also featured accompanying André Previn on the 1998 Deutsche Grammophon album release 'We Got Rhythm: A Gershwin Songbook'.

Finck's debut release as a leader, Future Day, was released in 2008 on Soundbrush Records. The album features Joe Locke, Tom Ranier, and Joe LaBarbera, as well as guest appearances from Jeremy Pelt and Bob Sheppard.

Discography

As leader
Future Day (Soundbrush, 2008)

As sideman
With Jon Benjamin
Well, I Should Have...* (Sub Pop, 2015)With Steve KuhnLooking Back (Concord, 1990)
Years Later (Concord, 1992)
Remembering Tomorrow (ECM, 1995)
Dedication (Reservoir, 1997)
Countdown (Reservoir, 1998)
The Best Things (Reservoir, 1999)
Promises Kept (ECM, 2000)
Mostly Coltrane (ECM, 2008)With Tisziji MunozIncomprehensibly Gone (Anami Music, 2010)
Beauty As Beauty (Anami Music, 2013)
Realization of Paradox: Melting the Mind of Logic (Anami Music, 2014)
Songs of Soundlessness (Anami Music, 2015)
Atoms of Supersoul (Anami Music, 2016)
Scream of Ensoundment (Anami Music, 2017)With Paquito D'RiveraTico! Tico! (Chesky Records, 1989)
Havana Cafe (Chesky Records, 1992)With Badi AssadEchoes of Brazil (Chesky Records, 1997)With André Previn We Got Rhythm: A Gershwin Songbook (Deutsche Grammophon, 1998)
 We Got It Good and That Ain't Bad: An Ellington Songbook (Deutsche Grammophon, 1999)
 Live at the Jazz Standard (Decca, 2001)With André Previn and Sylvia McNair' Sure Thing: The Jerome Kern Songbook (Philips, 1996)
 Come Rain or Shine: The Harold Arlen Songbook'' (Philips, 1996)

References

American jazz double-bassists
Male double-bassists
American jazz bass guitarists
1958 births
Living people
Guitarists from New York (state)
People from Rochester, New York
American male bass guitarists
20th-century American bass guitarists
21st-century double-bassists
20th-century American male musicians
21st-century American male musicians
American male jazz musicians
Jazz musicians from New York (state)